The FTSE techMARK 100 (pronounced "foot see"; Index code (marker): T1X) is an index derived from the FTSE techMARK All-Share Index, which represents the performance of innovative and technology companies that are listed on the London Stock Exchange's "techMARK" market.

Constituents of the FTSE techMARK 100 include:
BAE Systems
Elan Corp
BATM Advanced Communications
Smith & Nephew
Shire
Cable & Wireless
Thomson Reuters
Sage Group
Cobham
Meggitt
Autonomy Corporation
LogicaCMG
ARM Holdings
Qinetiq Group
Spectris
Aveva Group
Ultra Electronics Holdings
Dimension Data Holdings
Renishaw
Spirent Communications
Micro Focus International
Genus
Detica Group
Domino Printing Sciences
Axon Group
Computacenter
Fidessa Group
KCOM Group
SDL International
Gresham Technologies plc

See also
FTSE Group
FTSE 100 Index
FTSE 250 Index
FTSE 350 Index

References

External links
 FTSE Group website

Lists of companies of the United Kingdom
Companies of the United Kingdom
FTSE Group stock market indices
British stock market indices